The Histronic is an electronic music and livetronica band based in Minneapolis, Minnesota, USA. The current members are Mike Moilanen (guitar) and Kevin Dorsey (keyboard).

History 
Formerly a live electro trio, The Histronic now features the duo of: DJ and guitarist Mike Moilanen, and DJ and keyboard player Kevin Dorsey.  Dorsey is a founding member of the group, a graduate of the University of Denver's Lamont School of music, and the owner of a recording studio in Plymouth, Minnesota (Milkhouse Productions).  Mike Moilanen is the resident Saturday night DJ at the 414 Soundbar club in Minneapolis, a fixture in the house music scene in Minneapolis, and a producer of house, deep house, and tech house.

The Histronic has played festivals such as: 10,000 Lakes Festival, Harvest Fest, Summer Dance (at Nelson Ledges Quarry Park), and Fat Fest.  The band has performed alongside national acts such as: EOTO, Lotus, Particle, Motet Trio, Flaming Lips, Phil Lesh and Friends, George Clinton and P Funk; Medeski, Scofield, Martin, & Wood;  Michael Franti & Spearhead,  DJ Harry, The Allmighty Senators, Spam Allstars, Darkstar Orchestra, Wookiefoot, Kinetix, Omaur Bliss, Yoni, Mike Moilanen, Sol Spectre, Papadosio, Aleph-1, Shoeless Revolution, Jeff Bujak, Digital Frontier, MO2- Mind Orchestra, and Steez.

Style
The Histronic spins house, deep house, tech house, techno, breakbeat, dubstep, and nu disco.  They also add instruments such as analog synthesizers, Hammond organs, and guitars to their show.

Discography 
 The Histronic (self-released, 2008)
 Live Cuts Volume Two (2008)
 Live Cuts Volume One (2007)

Press reviews
According to an article in Jambands.com in 2008:

The band has also been reviewed in the Duluth Budgeteer Review (July 10, 2008) and Volume One Magazine Review (November 20, 2008).

References

External links 
 The Histronic homepage (tourdates, info, news, press)
 The Histronic Live Show Archive @ Archive.org

Jam bands
Culture of Minneapolis
Livetronica music groups
Musical groups from Minnesota